Universidad SC or, more commonly known as, USAC or just Universidad is a Guatemalan football club that represents the Universidad de San Carlos de Guatemala. They currently compete in the Primera División, the second division in the nation. They are based in Guatemala City, and their home stadium is the Estadio Revolución. The team was formed in 1922, and won 6 league championships.

Honours

Domestic Tournaments
Liga Capitalina 61924, 1926, 1928, 1929, 1930, 1931

International TournamentsInteruniversitario Centroamericano 1
1966

Current squad

In

Out

Coaches
  Gustavo Faral (1999)
  Gustavo Faral (2003–05)
   Rafael Loredo (2008 – September 2010)
  Gilberto Yearwood (October 2010 – October 2012)
  Horacio Cordero (October 2012 – Nov 2014)
  Francisco Melgar (Dec 2014 – March 2015)
  Roberto Gamarra (March 2015 – September 2015)
  Ramiro Cepeda (September 2015 –)

References

https://web.archive.org/web/20061208102338/http://www.prensalibre.com/especiales/ME/guatefut/12.html

External links
 Official web site - universidadsc.com

USAC
USAC
Association football clubs established in 1922
1922 establishments in Guatemala
University and college association football clubs